The 2015–16 NCAA Division I women's ice hockey season began in September 2015 and ended with the 2016 NCAA Division I women's ice hockey tournament's championship game in March 2016.

Pre-season polls

The top 10 from USCHO.com, September 21, 2015, and the top 10 from USA Today/USA Hockey Magazine, First place votes are in parentheses.

Regular season

Standings

Player stats

Scoring leaders
The following players lead the NCAA in points at the conclusion of games played on March 24, 2016.

Leading goaltenders
The following goaltenders lead the NCAA in goals against average at the conclusion of games played on March 24, 2016 while playing at least 33% of their team's total minutes.

Awards

WCHA

CHA

Women's Hockey East Association (WHEA)

ECAC

Patty Kazmaier Award

AHCA Coach of the Year

References

 
NCAA
NCAA Division I women's ice hockey seasons